Maya Tolstoy is a marine geophysicist known for her work on earthquakes in the deep sea. From Fall 2018 through December 2019 she was the Interim Executive Vice President and Dean of the Faculty of Arts and Sciences at Columbia University. As of 2022, she is the Maggie Walker Dean in the College of the Environment at the University of Washington.

Education and career 
Tolstoy was interested in both science and theater while growing up, but a fascination with earthquakes led her to a career in geoscience. Tolstoy received her B.S. in geophysics from the University of Edinburgh in 1988 and earned a Ph.D. from Scripps Institution of Oceanography in 1994. Following her Ph.D., she was first a postdoctoral research at Scripps Institution of Oceanography and then at Lamont–Doherty Earth Observatory. In 1996 she joined the faculty at Lamont–Doherty Earth Observatory, and was promoted to professor in 2016. In January 2022 she started her position as the Maggie Walker Dean of the College of the Environment at the University of Washington.

Research 
Tolstoy is known for her research using sound in the ocean to deep-sea earthquakes. Her early research investigated a 2006 undersea eruption on the East Pacific Rise. While many of her instruments were trapped in lava, enough could be recovered to track the sequence of events that led to the eruption. Her subsequent research has examined earthquakes at Axial Seamount, the connections between tides and deep-sea earthquakes, and the along-axis flow of fluids at the East Pacific Rise. Tolstoy's research has linked changes in sea level with patterns of earthquake activity in the deep sea, research which has implications for the release of carbon dioxide, a greenhouse gas, into the atmosphere. 

In addition to her research, Tolstoy led an initiative defining issues encountered by women in science that culminated in a 2018 report that presented issues at Columbia University, and she has worked to overcome issues in unequal treatment of women and minorities in hiring for academic positions. Tolstoy was also in the 2005 James Cameron film about the deep ocean Aliens of the Deep, and was a finalist in the 2009 astronaut interview process at NASA.

Selected publications

Awards and honors 
In 2009, Tolstoy received a Women of Discovery Award for her work on deep-sea exploration. She was a 2012 invited speaker at the Nobel Conference, and delivered the 2016 Francis Birch Lecture at the American Geophysical Union meeting.

References

External links 

 
 , May 13, 2013 TEDxCERN

University of California, San Diego alumni
Alumni of the University of Edinburgh
Lamont–Doherty Earth Observatory people
University of Washington faculty
Marine geologists
Women geophysicists
Women climatologists
Acousticians
Year of birth missing (living people)
Living people